Hews or HEWS may refer to:
 The action of hewing
 Chay Hews (born 1976), Australian Rules Football player
 Francis Hews (1768–1810), English Baptist preacher
 Health extension workers, abbreviated HEWs

See also
 HEW (disambiguation)
 Hew
 Hewes (disambiguation)